Dan is a kibbutz in northern Israel. Located in the north of the Hula Valley, at the foot of Mount Hermon, it falls under the jurisdiction of Upper Galilee Regional Council.

History
Kibbutz Dan was founded in 1939 by Jewish farmers from Transylvania as part of the Wall and tower campaign. It is affiliated with the Hashomer Hatzair movement. In 1947, the population was 340. Dan was one of two villages established in honour of Menachem Ussishkin. It was named after the Israelite town of "Dan" mentioned in 1 Kings 12:29, 1 Samuel 3:20 and Genesis 14:14, and which has been identified with the nearby Tel Dan. Kibbutz Dan is located in the territory of the Israelite tribe of Dan (Joshua 19:47). It suffered heavy losses during the 1948 Arab–Israeli War, bearing the brunt of the Syrian invasion.

Economy
One of the first economic branches in the kibbutz was a cooperative trout-breeding venture with neighbouring Kibbutz Dafna.

The Caviar Galilee Company, which exports caviar under the brand name "Karat Caviar," is based on the kibbutz. According to Eric Ripert, chef and proprietor of Le Bernadin, considered the leading seafood restaurant in New York, and Jean Francois Bruel, chef of Daniel, a Michelin 3-star rated restaurant in Manhattan's Upper East Side, the best caviar on the market today is produced by Kibbutz Dan. The kibbutz exports caviar to the United States, Europe, Russia, Japan, Singapore and Canada. In 2011, the company produced 3,000 kilograms. It has plans to increase production gradually to 8,000 kilograms a year.

A museum for the nature and history of the area, "Bet Ussishkin", operates at the Kibbutz.

Landmarks
Kibbutz Dan is the starting point of the Israel National Trail.

References

Kibbutzim
Kibbutz Movement
Populated places established in 1939
Jewish villages in Mandatory Palestine
1939 establishments in Mandatory Palestine
Populated places in Northern District (Israel)
Romanian-Jewish culture in Israel